Rosin-Rammler distribution may refer to:
The mathematical form of the distribution, the Weibull distribution
The application of the Rosin-Rammler distribution to particle size analysis of comminution processes